Hambro Perks is a London-headquartered investment firm. Hambro Perks was founded in 2013 by Rupert Hambro CBE and Dominic Perks. Sir Anthony Salz is the Chairman of Hambro Perks.

The Financial Times described the Hambro Perks as "an unlikely fusion of old and new City — clubby establishment networking alongside high-tech entrepreneurial energy."

Portfolio Companies 
The Hambro Perks portfolio is made up of over 100 firms including:

 Takumi - puts brands in touch with "social influencers" 
 Kortext - digital textbook platform in the UK 
 what3words - re-maps the world in 3M by 3M blocks 
 Previse - AI Fintech startup 
Muzmatch - Muslim dating app  
Tide - mobile banking services for small businesses 
Gelesis - biotechnology company developing treatments for obesity  
HawkEye 360 - geospatial analytics company
Movewise - multi-agent property seller 

Other notable investments linked to Hambro Perks include Sipsmith, which was sold to drinks giant Beam Suntory in 2016.

History 
Hambro Perks Ltd.  was founded in 2013 by Rupert Hambro CBE and Dominic Perks. The firm was originally conceived as a venture investor and incubator.

In August 2017, Hambro Perks hired Kate Burns to run its new media division. Burns was managing director of UK business at Google from 2001 until 2006 before becoming regional director of UK, Ireland, and Benelux as the US web giant expanded. Later, she became the chief executive of European business at AOL.

In December 2020, Hambro Perks was reported to have established a fund specialising in environmental technology chaired by the prominent businessman Sir John Rose.

In January 2021, it announced the establishment of the Hambro Perks Special Opportunities Fund which includes companies sold by Invesco in the wake of the Neil Woodford scandal.

In October 2021, The Sunday Telegraph reported that the firm had established a fund to help 'paper millionaire' entrepreneurs and company founders sell part of their shareholdings. Hambro Perks Co-founder Dominic Perks said his aim with the new fund is to give investors access to shares in fast-growing companies that “will be the stars of the stock market in a few years time”.

The new fund has already backed companies including NA-KD, one of Europe’s fastest-growing fashion e-commerce companies, set up by entrepreneur Jarno Vanhatapio.

In November 2021, Hambro Perks was named as the sponsor for the first-ever Special-purpose acquisition company to be listed on the London Stock Exchange following changes to the rules required to list the vehicles.
The listed company, Hambro Perks Acquisition Company, will be chaired by Sir Anthony Salz, with veteran investor Dominic Shorthouse also joining the board.

In December 2021, the listing of Hambro Perks Acquisition Company (HPAC) was confirmed as having completed., with co-founder Dominic Perks described by The Times as a 'blazing a trail in London’s embryonic market for special purpose acquisition companies'.

See also
Carl Joachim Hambro (banker)
Rupert Hambro
Sir Anthony Salz
Sir John Rose
Clive Hollick

References

External links
Official site

Investment management companies of the United Kingdom